Skała is the Polish word for rock.

Places 
Skała, a town in Lesser Poland Voivodeship (south Poland)
Skała, Jawor County in Lower Silesian Voivodeship (south-west Poland)
Skała, Lwówek Śląski County in Lower Silesian Voivodeship (south-west Poland)
Skała, Strzelin County in Lower Silesian Voivodeship (south-west Poland)
Skała, Wrocław County in Lower Silesian Voivodeship (south-west Poland)
Skała, Świętokrzyskie Voivodeship (south-central Poland)

Other uses
Skała, a 2009 album by Polish singer Kayah

See also